William Smith (c. 1931 – 24 April 2009) was a Scottish footballer who played as a left back, primarily for Aberdeen.

He was a regular in the team which won the club's first Scottish Football League championship in the 1954–55 season, although towards the end of that campaign he broke a leg in the semi-final of the Scottish Cup against Clyde, and was out of action for 18 months. He had also played at the same stage in the 1952–53 Scottish Cup to help Aberdeen progress, but was not selected for the final which they lost to Rangers after a replay (the veteran Davie Shaw taking the position in what were his last appearances before retirement). In 1954 the Dons reached the showpiece event again – being defeated by Celtic – but that season David Caldwell was generally first choice.

After being released by Aberdeen in 1957, Smith later played for Third Lanark and for Deveronvale in the Highland League before emigrating to South Africa.

References

1931 births
2009 deaths
Year of birth uncertain
Date of birth unknown
Footballers from Aberdeen
Scottish footballers
Association football fullbacks
Aberdeen F.C. players
Third Lanark A.C. players
Deveronvale F.C. players
Scottish Junior Football Association players
Scottish Football League players
Highland Football League players
Scottish emigrants to South Africa